DiSanto Field, on the campus of Case Western Reserve University in Cleveland, Ohio, is a 2,400-seat multi-purpose football stadium  home to the Case Western Reserve Spartans football, men's and women's soccer, men's and women's lacrosse, and men's and women's track and field teams.  

The press box includes the Coach Bill Edwards president's suite, named after the College Football Hall of Fame inductee coach.  In 2008, the eight-lane track surrounding the field was named Coach Bill Sudeck Track. 

The Case Western Reserve Spartans football team played its first home game in the new stadium on September 10, 2005, defeating the Denison Big Red 20-6.

Renovation history

In 2014, the Wyant Field House opened, which included the 4500-square foot Steve Belichick Varsity Weight Room, gifted by Bill Belichick in honor of his father.

In 2017, the field was resurfaced with FieldTurf Revolution 360 fiber and an EcoSense EPDM (ethylene propylene diene) fill.

Draft Day

In the 2014 movie, Draft Day, DiSanto Field stood in for Camp Randall Stadium of the Wisconsin Badgers.

References

External links
http://athletics.case.edu/facilities/disanto_field

American football venues in Ohio
Buildings and structures in Cleveland
College football venues
Case Western Reserve University
Case Western Spartans football
Sports venues in Cleveland
Sports venues in Ohio
University Circle
Defunct National Premier Soccer League stadiums
Soccer venues in Ohio
Lacrosse venues in the United States
2005 establishments in Ohio
Sports venues completed in 2005